Thunderbolt is a town located in Chatham County, Georgia, United States, approximately five miles southeast of downtown Savannah.  As of the 2020 census, the town had a total population of 2,556. It is part of the Savannah Metropolitan Statistical Area. Thunderbolt runs along the western shore of the Wilmington River (a tidal river that is part of the U.S. Intracoastal Waterway). The town is important to Georgia's shrimping industry, with scores of docks for shrimping trawlers. The town's picturesque atmosphere and seafood restaurants draw many local visitors.

History
An early variant name was "Warsaw". The Georgia General Assembly incorporated the town as "Warsaw" in 1856. An act of legislature officially changed the town's name to "Thunderbolt" in 1921.

According to tradition, Thunderbolt was named from an incident when lightning strike caused a spring to open up.

Geography

Thunderbolt is located at 32°1'56" North, 81°3'6" West (32.032111, -81.051733).

According to the United States Census Bureau, the town has a total area of 1.5 square miles (3.8 km), of which 1.3 square miles (3.3 km) is land and 0.2 square mile (0.5 km) is water.

Demographics

2020 census

As of the 2020 United States census, there were 2,556 people, 1,091 households, and 516 families residing in the town.

2010 census
As of the census of 2010, there were 2,668 people, 1,088 households, and 565 families residing in the town. The racial makeup of the town was 52.9% White, 35.1% African American, 0.6% Native American, 4.6% Asian, 0.1% Pacific Islander, 4.2% from other races, and 2.7% from two or more races.  9.0% of the population were Hispanic or Latino of any race.

There were 997 households, out of which 21.6% had children under the age of 18 living with them, 33.5% were married couples living together, 14.2% had a female householder with no husband present, and 43.1% were non-families. 36.4% of all households were made up of individuals, and 11.1% had someone living alone who was 65 years of age or older.  The average household size was 2.19 and the average family size was 2.85.

In the town, the population was spread out, with 17.6% under the age of 18, 9.2% from 18 to 24, 28.1% from 25 to 44, 23.8% from 45 to 64, and 21.2% who were 65 years of age or older.  The median age was 39.2 years. For every 100 females, there were 89.8 males.  For every 100 females age 18 and over, there were 85.8 males.

The median income for a household in the town was $45,327, and the median income for a family was $49,583. Males had a median income of $34,167 versus $22,128 for females. The per capita income for the town was $22,592. 13.6% of the population and 8.4% of families were below the poverty line. 33.3% of those under the age of 18 and 5.6% of those 65 and older were living below the poverty line.

See also 
 Samuel Bowen, who grew the first soya beans introduced to North America in Thunderbolt.

References

Towns in Chatham County, Georgia
Towns in Georgia (U.S. state)
Savannah metropolitan area
Populated coastal places in Georgia (U.S. state)